The 2012 UCI Juniors Track World Championships were the World Championship for track cycling. They took place at the Invercargill ILT Velodrome in Invercargill, New Zealand from 22 to 26 August 2012. Nineteen events were scheduled.

Medal table

Medal summary

External links
trackcyclingnews.com

UCI Juniors Track World Championships
Uci Juniors Track World Championships, 2012
Track cycling
Sport in Invercargill
International cycle races hosted by New Zealand